The women's team épée competition in fencing at the 2012 Olympic Games in London was held on 4 August at the ExCeL Exhibition Centre.

Competition format
This team events featured eight national teams. Great Britain, as hosts were allowed to enter a team in any event they chose, however they chose not to enter this event. First-round losers continued fencing bouts to determine ranking for fifth through eighth spots, while the quarter-final winners met in the semi-finals. The winners of the semi-final bouts competed for the gold medal, while the losing teams competed for the bronze.

Team events competed to a maximum of 45 touches. In the event of a tie, a one-minute playoff occurred. Should any team make a touch they would be declared the winner, however if both teams touch in the same play then there would not be any addition to the total score.

Schedule 
All times are British Summer Time (UTC+1)

Draw

Finals

Classification 5–8

Final classification

References

Results 

Women's team epee
2012 in women's fencing
Women's events at the 2012 Summer Olympics